Orrvale is a small town in Victoria, Australia. It is located in the City of Greater Shepparton.

The town is named after William Orr, a politician and mining prospector in the early 20th century.

References

Towns in Victoria (Australia)
City of Greater Shepparton